Besahara is a  1987 Bollywood family drama film directed by B.R. Ishara. It stars Rajan Sippy, Kader Khan, Bharat Kapoor, Shashikala, Priya Tendulkar and Vidyashree.

Cast
 Rajan Sippy as Rakesh
 Vidyashree as Nanda
 Priya Tendulkar as Charu (Din Dayal's Daughter)
 Kader Khan as Nawab Rahim Khan
 Mazhar Khan as Nilesh (Din Dayal's Son)
 Shashikala as Rakesh's Mother
 Sulbha Deshpande as Nanda's Mother
 Bharat Kapoor
 Shriram Lagoo as Seth Din Dayal
 Yunus Parvez as Seth
 Vikas Anand as Police Inspector

Soundtrack
"Dushman Hai Sab Ki Jaanki" - Mohammed Aziz 
"Mujhko Raahon Pe Tum Chhodkar" - Hemlata
"Saajan Teri Baahon Mein" - Anuradha Paudwal
"Suniye Huzoor Aadmi Ki" - Vinod Sehgal

References

External links
 

1987 films
1980s Hindi-language films
Films scored by Usha Khanna
Films directed by B. R. Ishara